Ruth Shonle Cavan (August 28, 1896 – August 25, 1993) was an American sociologist based at the University of Chicago. She specialized in deviance and criminology and was a leader of the Chicago school of sociology.  According to Moyer (1989):
 Ruth Shonle Cavan is recognized by most current criminologists as an extraordinary writer with analytical skills and the ability to synthesize the research in the field. One of the major strengths of her writings is her ability to build on the theoretical perspectives and methodologies of the Chicago School and to use other perspectives and methodologies when appropriate....[M]ost current criminologists only regard Cavan as a great textbook writer.

Recognition
Since 1997, the American Society of Criminology has given the Ruth Shonle Cavan Young Scholar Award annually to a distinguished young researcher in the field of criminology.

Notes

Further reading
 Ferdinand, Theodore N. "Ruth Shonle Cavan: An Intellectual Portrait." Sociological Inquiry 58.4 (1988): 337-343.
 Moyer, Imogene L. "The Life and Works of Ruth Shonle Cavan: Pioneer Woman in Criminology." Journal of Crime and Justice 13.1 (1989): 133-158.
 Moyer, Imogene L.  "Cavan's Continuum of Behavior: A Proposed Conceptual Model for the Expansion of Narrowly Focused Criminological Theory." Journal of Crime and Justice 19.2 (1996): 181-194.
 Moyer, Imogene L. "Ruth Shonle Cavan” in Mary Jo Deegan (ed.), Women in Sociology: A Bio-bibliographical Sourcebook (Greenwood), pp. 90–99.
  Moyer,  Imogene. Criminological Theories: Traditional and Non-Traditional Voices and Themes (2001) pp 91-101. online
  Moyer, Imogene. Changing Roles of Women in the Criminal Justice System: Offenders, Victims, and Professionals (2nd ed 2001)

External links
Ruth Shonle Cavan (1896-1993): A Tribute, Women & Criminal Justice, 1996
Obituary in the Chicago Tribune'', August 28, 1993

American sociologists
1896 births
1993 deaths
American women sociologists
20th-century American women
University of Chicago faculty